Jharkhand Vananchal Congress, a political party in Jharkhand, India. The party is led by Samresh Singh. The JVC has been merged into Bahujan Samaj Party.

Political parties in Jharkhand
Political parties with year of establishment missing